Keith Russell Ablow (born November 23, 1961) is an American author, television personality, and former psychiatrist. He is a former contributor for Fox News Channel and TheBlaze.

Formerly an assistant clinical professor at Tufts University School of Medicine, Ablow resigned as a member of the American Psychiatric Association in 2011, in protest to the APA's tacit support of transgender surgeries, which he considered irresponsible. Ablow's medical license was suspended in May 2019 by the Massachusetts Board of Registration in Medicine. The board concluded he posed an "immediate and serious threat to the public health, safety and welfare", alleging that he had engaged in sexual and unethical misconduct towards patients. 

According to the Associated Press, Ablow "freely mixes psychiatric assessments with political criticism, a unique twist in the realm of cable news commentary that some medical colleagues find unethical."

Early life and education
Ablow was born in Marblehead, Massachusetts, the son of Jewish parents Jeanette Norma and Allan Murray Ablow. Ablow attended Marblehead High School, graduating in 1979. He graduated from Brown University in 1983, magna cum laude, with a Bachelor of Science degree in neurosciences. He received his Doctor of Medicine degree from Johns Hopkins Medical School in 1987 and completed his psychiatry residency at the Tufts-New England Medical Center. He was Board Certified by the American Board of Psychiatry & Neurology in psychiatry in 1993 and forensic psychiatry in 1999.

While a medical student, he worked as a reporter for Newsweek and a freelancer for The Washington Post and Baltimore Sun and USA Today. After his residency, Ablow served as medical director of the Tri-City Mental Health Centers and then became medical director of Heritage Health Systems and Associate Medical Director of Boston Regional Medical Center.

Television and writing career
Ablow has written columns for publications including The New York Times, The Washington Post, U.S. News & World Report, USA Today, Newsweek, The Baltimore Sun, The Boston Herald and FoxNews.com. He has appeared on The Oprah Winfrey Show, The Today Show, The Howard Stern Show, Good Morning America, CBS Early Show, Larry King Live, The Tyra Banks Show, Nancy Grace (CNN) program, Catherine Crier Live, The Dr. Oz Show, Fox & Friends, Geraldo, Imus, Montel, Inside Edition, Showbiz Tonight, and The O'Reilly Factor. Ablow has written 15 books, some published by the American Psychiatric Association, been published in the Journal of the American Medical Association and written for Psychiatric Times.

From June 2006 through September 2007, Ablow was host and executive producer of his own national daily talk show, The Dr. Keith Ablow Show, syndicated by Warner Bros. Domestic Television Distribution. Since his show's cancellation, Ablow has been a contributing editor for Good Housekeeping and a columnist for the New York Post. He contributed commentary and analysis for the Fox News Channel until 2017.

Punditry 
In April 2011, Ablow wrote a health column for FoxNews.com which criticized designer Jenna Lyons for publishing an advertisement in the J. Crew catalogue in which she was depicted painting her young son's toenails hot pink. Ablow wrote that gender distinctions are "part of the magnificent synergy that creates and sustains the human race." The column sparked a controversy around his claims that painting a child's toenails pink could have an effect on their gender identity and led to accusations of overreaction, as was reported upon by numerous news media sources.

During the 2012 Republican primary, Ablow wrote a column arguing that Newt Gingrich’s three marriages actually made him more qualified to be president. He wrote: "When three women want to sign on for life with a man who is now running for president, I worry more about whether we'll be clamoring for a third Gingrich term, not whether we'll want to let him go after one." The column was harshly criticized, with Rod Dreher, of The American Conservative, commenting thus: "Oh for frack's sake. At some point, you have to wonder when shamelessness crosses the line from character defect to psychopathology. If only Dr. Leo Spaceman were a Republican, he could have a lucrative career on Fox."

In 2013, Ablow said that marriage had "died" because of same-sex marriage. In 2014, he likened same-sex marriage to polygamous relationships or bestiality. He has linked gay parenting to sexual abuse of children.

In June 2014, Ablow accused the 2014 World Cup of having been a plot by President Barack Obama to distract America from what Ablow believed were Obama administration scandals.

In August 2014, as a guest co-host on the Fox News show, Outnumbered, Ablow criticized First Lady Michelle Obama's weight, stating "she needs to drop a few [pounds]." He told the women panelists on the show that they also needed to lose weight.

In October 2014, concerning the Ebola outbreak in West Africa, Ablow, on Fox News, promoted a conspiracy theory that Obama wanted Ebola to spread to America because he wanted America to suffer as much as poor countries. He stated that President Obama was not protecting the United States from Ebola because his "affiliations" and "affinities" were more with Africa than with America. His Ebola comments drew criticism, including from Fox television host Greg Gutfeld.

In May 2015, on another segment of Outnumbered, Ablow stated that he believed that men should be able to "veto" women's abortions.

Ablow was chief spokesperson and brand ambassador for Golo, a company that sells a weight loss supplement. Progressive media watchdog group Media Matters for America raised questions about whether Ablow's endorsement of Golo violates Fox News' policy against product endorsements.

Medical ethics 
The Associated Press has reported that Ablow "freely mixes psychiatric assessments with political criticism, a unique twist in the realm of cable news commentary that some medical colleagues find unethical." Ablow has, for instance, frequently diagnosed former President Barack Obama as having "abandonment issues," without ever having met or treated the former president. He has asserted that Obama dislikes the United States, that he prefers Africa to the United States, and wants the United States to dissolve. He publicly speculated, in an October 2012 Huffington Post op-ed that then-Vice President Joe Biden had dementia after his 2012 VP debate performance.

Ford Vox, a staff physiatrist at the Shepherd Center in Atlanta, said that Ablow's attempts to connect his political views to medical analysis "is really just irresponsible and it's embarrassing for physicians in general." Jeffrey Lieberman, chairman of psychiatry at Columbia University's College of Physicians and Surgeons, and past president of the American Psychiatric Association, remarked, "It is shameful and unfortunate that he is given a platform by Fox News or any other media organization. Basically he is a narcissistic self-promoter of limited and dubious expertise."

Sexual assault allegations 
On February 21, 2019, the Boston Globe reported that Ablow had been accused by multiple patients and employees of sexual assault and harassment; three malpractice lawsuits by former patients allege physical and verbal abuse, and three former employees filed affidavits claiming threatening and abusive behavior. The lawsuits were settled out-of-court in the summer of 2019.

On May 15, 2019, the Massachusetts Board of Registration in Medicine indefinitely suspended Ablow’s medical license, concluding he posed an "immediate and serious threat to the public health, safety and welfare." New York state has also suspended Ablow's medical license in that state.

DEA raid
On February 13, 2020, Ablow’s office in Newburyport, Massachusetts was raided by Drug Enforcement Administration agents executing a search warrant.  He has denied allegations of inappropriate sexual activity with patients and illegally diverting prescription drugs. 

It is alleged that Ablow prescribed medication to eight employees.  When the Board of Registration in Medicine rescinded his license in 2019, they also claimed Ablow asked the employees to share the medication with him. In the raid the DEA discovered Ablow had a laptop belonging to the son of former Vice President and then presidential candidate Joe Biden. In 2019, Hunter Biden left his computer at the office of Keith Ablow, a Newburyport, Massachusetts therapist Hunter Biden visited for help with drug addiction and Ablow has acknowledged that Hunter Biden left his laptop at a bungalow attached to his office in 2019

Potential U.S. Senate candidacy
In January 2013, Ablow expressed his interests in possibly running for the U.S. Senate seat vacated by John Kerry, On February 5, 2013, Ablow announced that he would seek the Republican nomination, but only if he did not have to face a primary battle. On February 6, 2013, Ablow said he would not run since other Republican contenders entered the race, and declared his support for Republican State Rep. Dan Winslow.

Bibliography

Non-fiction
Medical School: Getting In, Staying In, Staying Human (1987)
How to Cope with Depression (1989)
To Wrestle With Demons: A Psychiatrist Struggles to Understand His Patients and Himself (1992)
Anatomy of a Psychiatric Illness: Healing the Mind and Brain (1993)
The Strange Case of Dr. Kappler: The Doctor Who Became a Killer (1994)
Without Mercy: The Shocking True Story of a Doctor Who Murdered (1996)
Inside the Mind of Scott Peterson (2005)
Living the Truth: Transform Your Life Through the Power of Insight and Honesty (2007)
The 7: Seven Wonders That Will Change Your Life (2011) (co-authored with Glenn Beck)
Inside the Mind of Casey Anthony: A Psychological Portrait (2011)
Trump Your Life: 25 Life Lessons from the Ups and Downs of the 45th President of the United States (2020) (co-authored with Christian Josi)

Fiction/mystery 
The series features Frank Clevenger, a forensic psychiatrist from Massachusetts.
Denial (1998)
Projection (1999)
Compulsion (2002)
Psychopath (2003)
Murder Suicide (2004)
The Architect (2005)

References

External links

FOX Health blog, "Mind of the News"
Contributor for SingleMindedWomen.com
Keith Ablow interview, about one of his books (Murder/Suicide)
Interview with Ablow on 'How to Make Your Marriage Last' 
TV Series Finale - TV series cancellation details

20th-century American novelists
20th-century American male writers
21st-century American novelists
21st-century American male writers
American male bloggers
American bloggers
American crime fiction writers
Jewish American writers
American male novelists
American medical writers
American mystery novelists
American non-fiction crime writers
American psychology writers
American television personalities
Male television personalities
Living people
People from Marblehead, Massachusetts
Massachusetts Republicans
Novelists from Massachusetts
1961 births
Brown University alumni
Johns Hopkins School of Medicine alumni
Tufts University faculty
20th-century American non-fiction writers
21st-century American non-fiction writers
Marblehead High School alumni
21st-century American Jews